Caryota rumphiana, whose common names include the fishtail or Albert palm, is a Caryota or fish tail palm (Family Palmae or Arecaceae). It is native to Philippines, Sulawesi, Maluku, New Guinea, Solomon Islands, Bismarck Archipelago.   Its leaves have a distinctive fishtail shape and its flowers have been described as mop-like. It is monocarpic. These leaves are bipinnate with as many as 1,800 fan-shaped or wedge-shaped leaflets, each up to 15 inches (38 centimeters) long by six inches (15 cm) wide.

References

rumphiana
Flora of Malesia
Flora of Papuasia
Plants described in 1838